The Europe Zone was one of the three regional zones of the 1987 Davis Cup.

32 teams entered the Europe Zone in total, with 11 teams competing in the Africa Zone for 2 places in the Europe Zone main draws, joining an additional 21 teams. The winner of each sub-zone was then promoted to the following year's World Group.

Switzerland defeated the Soviet Union in the Zone A final, and Denmark defeated Austria in the Zone B final, resulting in both Switzerland and Denmark being promoted to the 1988 World Group.

Participating nations

Africa Zone: 

 
 
 
 
 
 
 
 
 
 
 

Europe Zones:

Africa Zone

Draw

  and  qualified to the Europe Zone main draws.

Europe Zone A

Draw

First round

Syria vs. Turkey

Malta vs. Ireland

Norway vs. Senegal

Quarterfinals

Turkey vs. Soviet Union

Ireland vs. Netherlands

Bulgaria vs. Senegal

Switzerland vs. Belgium

Semifinals

Netherlands vs. Soviet Union

Bulgaria vs. Switzerland

Final

Soviet Union vs. Switzerland

Europe Zone B

Draw

First round

Greece vs. Luxembourg

Monaco vs. Portugal

Zimbabwe vs. Poland

Finland vs. Cyprus

Quarterfinals

Austria vs. Greece

Portugal vs. Hungary

Romania vs. Poland

Finland vs. Denmark

Semifinals

Portugal vs. Austria

Denmark vs. Romania

Final

Denmark vs. Austria

References

External links
Davis Cup official website

Davis Cup Europe/Africa Zone
Europe Zone